Rajkot Junction railway station is a railway station in the city of Rajkot, Gujarat. It is a major railway station in Saurashtra. Many trains start from here.

Administration 
It falls under the Western Railway zone of the Indian Railways. It is the primary terminus for rail transport for the city; the other railway station in Rajkot is the Bhaktinagar railway station. Rajkot Junction railway station has been awarded as the undertaken by Railway ministry in participation with IRCTC.

Station development and modernization 
The station is undergoing large-scale automation and infrastructure development. Doubling of the Viramgam–Surendranagar–Rajkot route is in progress, of which Viramgam–Surendranagar route is almost completed and is to be commissioned soon for use for regular rail traffic. The doubling between Surendranagar–Rajkot is scheduled to be completed in the year 2020. Once doubling of rail route up to Rajkot is completed, it will reduce travelling time between Rajkot–Ahmedabad by up to 1 hour and a half hour approximately from currently 5 hours, and is expected to increase the number of daily trains and traffic. Doubling of this line will greatly ease the ever-increasing freight traffic between Okha–Rajkot, Porbandar–Kanalus, Veraval–Rajkot and Maliya Miyana / Navalakhi–Dahinsara–Wankaner section. The route (Ahmedabad–Rajkot) is also expected to be electrified in the near future and proposal for the same has been approved by Railway Board. A proposal, is being considered for railway track doubling between Rajkot Jn.–Okha railway stations by Western Railway, which has been sent to Railway Board for their approval.

Trains

Eighty-one trains halt at Rajkot Junction railway station in both directions.

Originating trains

References

External links
 Rajkot Junction railway station at India Rail Info

Railway stations in Rajkot district
Rajkot railway division
Railway junction stations in Gujarat
Railway stations in India opened in 1890
Transport in Rajkot